Virtual agent may refer to:

Computing and technology
 A virtual agent, a specialized software agent that interacts with humans in a human-agent team
 Virtual assistant
 Intelligent agent, in artificial intelligence
 Dialogue system
 Pedagogical agent
 Chatbot, a software robot

Other uses
 Virtual assistant (occupation), a person offering remote service

See also 
 Virtual actor
 Virtual character (disambiguation)
 Virtual friend (disambiguation)
 Virtual human (disambiguation)